The 2013 Twenty20 Cup (known for sponsorship reasons as the Friends Life t20) was the fourth season of the Friends Life t20 Twenty20 English cricket competition. The competition ran from 26 June to 17 August 2013. The teams and format of the tournament remained the same as the previous season. Northamptonshire Steelbacks were champions, defeating Surrey in the final to win their first limited overs trophy since 1992.

Format
The 18 teams were divided into three groups of six and each group played a double round-robin tournament. The top two teams from each group and the top two third-placed teams qualified for the knockout stage: a three-round single-elimination tournament. The top team from each group and the best second-placed team then played in a different quarter-final at their home ground. A free draw determined the placement of the remaining four teams and the semi-final and final match-ups.

Teams

Midlands/Wales/West Division

Table

Results

Fixtures

North Division

Table

†Durham were deducted 0.25 points for a breach of team salary payments in 2012.

Results

Fixtures

South Division

Table

Results

Fixtures

Knockout stage

Quarter-finals

Semi-finals

Final

Statistics

Highest team totals
The following table lists the five highest team scores in the season.

Most runs
The top five highest run scorers (total runs) in the season are included in this table.

Highest scores
This table contains the top five highest scores of the season made by a batsman in a single innings.

Most wickets
The following table contains the five leading wicket-takers of the season.

Best bowling figures
This table lists the top five players with the best bowling figures in the season.

Media coverage
Sky Sports showed many games during 2013, after showing them throughout the 2010, 2011 and 2012 seasons. S4C also offers some coverage with a few Glamorgan matches available with Welsh commentary.

References

External links
Tournament Site – Cricinfo
Friends Life t20 Microsite

Friends Life t20
Friends Life t20
2013
Friends Life t20
Twenty20 Cup
Twenty20 Cup
Twenty20 Cup